PGE Skra Bełchatów 2017–2018 season is the 2017/2018 volleyball season for Polish professional volleyball club PGE Skra Bełchatów.

The club competes in:
 Polish SuperCup
 Polish Championship
 Polish Cup
 FIVB Club World Championship
 CEV Champions League

On May 5, 2018 PGE Skra Bełchatów beat ZAKSA Kędzierzyn-Koźle in second match of finals and achieved 9th Polish title.

Team roster

Players of PGE Skra Bełchatów on loan in season 2017/18:

Squad changes for the 2017–2018 season
In:

Out:

Most Valuable Players

Results, schedules and standings

2017 Polish SuperCup
On September 23, 2017 PGE Skra beat ZAKSA Kędzierzyn-Koźle and achieved their third Polish SuperCup in history. Bartosz Bednorz was awarded a title of the Most Valuable Player.

2017–18 PlusLiga

Regular season

2017–18 Polish Cup

Quarterfinal

Semifinal

Final

2017 FIVB Club World Championship

Pool B

Semifinal

3rd place match

2017–18 CEV Champions League

Pool C

Playoff 12
The draws of the match pairs for the playoffs of 12 were held on March 2, 2018 in Luxembourg. PGE Skra was one of three Polish teams in this phase.

References

PGE Skra Bełchatów seasons